is a Japanese electrical engineer and professor emeritus with Chiba Institute of Technology, Chiba, Japan, lifetime IEEE Fellow.

The is the recipient of the 2019 IEEE Richard Harold Kaufmann Award  "for pioneering contributions to high-power converters and drives for highspeed-train and industrial applications" 

Among other achievements, his innovations in motor controllers were crucial for MAGLEV and Japanese bullet trains.

References

Year of birth missing (living people)
Living people
Japanese electrical engineers
IEEE award recipients
People from Chiba (city)